Gabriel de Sousa Barros (born 25 October 2001), known as Gabriel Barros, is a Brazilian footballer who plays as a forward for Ituano.

Club career

Ituano
Born in São Paulo, Gabriel Barros joined Ituano's youth setup in 2018 for the under-17 squad, after representing Red Bull Brasil and Osasco. He made his first team debut on 22 February 2020, coming on as a late substitute for Yago in a 2–0 Campeonato Paulista home win over Santos.

Gabriel Barros scored his first professional goal on 26 July 2020, netting his team's third in a 3–1 away success over Santo André. On 3 September, he renewed his contract until 2023.

Flamengo (loan)
On 16 October 2020, Gabriel Barros joined Flamengo and was initially assigned to the under-20 team. He made his first team debut for Fla the following 3 March, replacing Thiago Fernandes late in a 1–0 Campeonato Carioca away win over Nova Iguaçu.

On 2 December 2021, after four first team appearances, Gabriel Barros returned to Ituano after Flamengo opted to not exercise his buyout clause.

Breakthrough
Upon returning, Gabriel Barros was regularly used by Ituano during the 2022 season, being one of the spotlights of the club as they narrowly missed out promotion in the 2022 Série B.

Career statistics

Club

Honours

Club
Flamengo
Campeonato Carioca: 2021

References

2001 births
Living people
Footballers from São Paulo
Brazilian footballers
Association football forwards
Campeonato Brasileiro Série B players
Campeonato Brasileiro Série C players
Ituano FC players
CR Flamengo footballers